Carol Musyoka (born 1972) is a Kenyan lawyer, business executive and entrepreneur, who is the founder and chief executive officer of Carol Musyoka Consulting Limited, a Nairobi-based consultancy.

Background and education
She was born in Kenya and attended local schools for her pre-university education. She obtained her Bachelor of Laws degree from the University of Nairobi in July 1996. In May 1998, she completed Master of Laws  from Cornell Law School Ithaca, New York, in  United States.

Work experience
For one year following her graduation from Cornell University, Musyoka worked as project officer at Modern Africa Fund Managers, based in Washington, D.C., until 1999. In 1999 she returned to Kenya and was hired by Citibank Kenya, as a relationship manager based Nairobi, working in that capacity for four years until 2003.

In 2003 she was hired by Barclays Bank of Kenya as a senior relationship manager, working in that capacity for the next two years, before she was promoted to Corporate Director, a position she occupied for two years until 2007. For a period of one year, from 2007 until 2008, she served as the chief operating officer at K-Rep Bank, before it re-branded of Sidian Bank. In 2008, she went into private consulting.

Other considerations
Musyoka has been a member in the past or is currently a member of the boards of a number of public and private Kenyan companies, including (a) BAT Kenya (b) East African Breweries Limited (c) Barclays Bank of Kenya (d) K-Rep Bank (e) Business Registration Service of Kenya and (f) Kenya Airways. Carol Musyoka is a member of faculty at Strathmore Business School.

See also
 Rebecca Miano
 Sauda Rajab
 Teodosia Osir
 Kellen Kariuki

References

External links
Website of Carol Musyoka Consulting Limited 
Profile at East African Breweries Limited
Sights and sounds of Kampala traffic As of 31 March 2019.

Living people
1963 births
Kamba people
21st-century Kenyan businesswomen
21st-century Kenyan businesspeople
University of Nairobi alumni
Cornell University alumni
Kenyan chief executives
Kenyan women business executives